Groove Drops is a 1970 jazz album by Jimmy Smith, arranged, conducted and produced by Johnny Pate and released on the Verve label.

On the Billboard albums chart, Groove Drops peaked at number 197, and at 13 on the top Jazz albums chart.

Reception

Allmusic awarded the album two and a half stars, with reviewer Ron Wynn writing that the album had a:

Track listing
 "Groove Drops" (Jimmy Smith) – 4:15
 "Days of Wine and Roses" (Henry Mancini, Johnny Mercer) – 5:50
 "Sunny" (Bobby Hebb) – 6:00
 "Ode to Billie Joe" (Bobbie Gentry) – 6:25
 "Who Can I Turn To (When Nobody Needs Me)" (Leslie Bricusse, Anthony Newley) – 3:40
 "By the Time I Get to Phoenix" (Jimmy Webb) – 4:45

Personnel
 Jimmy Smith – Electronic organ
 Johnny Pate – arranger, conductor, producer
 George Piros – engineer
 Val Valentin – director of engineering

Chart performance

Album

References

External links
Groove Drops at The Incredible Jimmy Smith site

1970 albums
Albums arranged by Johnny Pate
Albums produced by Johnny Pate
Jimmy Smith (musician) albums
Verve Records albums